Steve Cooreman  (born 28 December 1976) is a Belgian football defender who last played for Hamarkameratene in the Norwegian Tippeliga.

Steve is the son of Maurice Cooreman.

External links
 
 footballplus
 worldsoccerstats

1976 births
Living people
Belgian footballers
K.A.A. Gent players
Beerschot A.C. players
Hamarkameratene players
Expatriate footballers in Norway
Belgian expatriate sportspeople in Norway
Belgian Pro League players
Eliteserien players
Association football defenders